Waccamaw River Memorial Bridge is a historic bridge located at Conway in Horry County, South Carolina.

It was built in 1937 and opened to the public in April 1938, designated as a memorial to Horry County citizens who served in America's wars from the American Revolution through the First World War. Its cost was $370,000.  It is 1,270 feet long and carries U.S. Route 501 Business over the Waccamaw River. It is a multi-span continuous steel girder bridge made up of four steel girder main spans, four continuous steel string approach spans, and concrete piers which support the bridge deck. It features 28 cast-iron light standards along the balustrade, and the Gothic-influenced pointed arches cut out of its concrete piers.

It was listed on the National Register of Historic Places in 1994.

Gallery

See also
 
 
 
 
 List of bridges on the National Register of Historic Places in South Carolina
 National Register of Historic Places listings in Horry County, South Carolina

References

External links
Waccamaw River Memorial Bridge - Conway, South Carolina - U.S. National Register of Historic Places on Waymarking.com

Road bridges on the National Register of Historic Places in South Carolina
Buildings and structures in Conway, South Carolina
Transportation in Horry County, South Carolina
Bridges completed in 1937
National Register of Historic Places in Horry County, South Carolina
Bridges of the United States Numbered Highway System
U.S. Route 501
1937 establishments in South Carolina
Steel bridges in the United States
Girder bridges in the United States